Malaysia competed at the 2000 Summer Olympics in Sydney, Australia.

Athletics

Men
Track event

Women
Road event

Badminton

Diving

Men

Women

Gymnastics

Artistic
Women

Hockey

Men's tournament

Team roster

 Jamaluddin Roslan
 Maninderjit Singh Magmar
 Chua Boon Huat
 Krishnamurthy Gobinathan
 Kuhan Shanmuganathan
 Nor Azlan Bakar
 Chairil Anwar Abdul Aziz
 Mohan Jiwa
 Mohamed Madzli Ikmar
 Ibrahim Suhaimi
 Nor Saiful Zaini Nasiruddin
 Keevan Raj
 Mirnawan Nawawi
 Calvin Fernandez
 Saiful Azli Abdul Rahman
 Mohamed Nasihin Nubil Ibrahim

Pool A

 Advanced to semifinals

Ninth to twelfth place classification

Eleventh and twelfth place match

Ranked 11th in final standings

Sailing

Open

Shooting

Women

Swimming

Men

Women

Taekwondo

Women

References

 Wallechinsky, David (2004). The Complete Book of the Summer Olympics (Athens 2004 Edition). Toronto, Canada. .
 International Olympic Committee (2001). The Results. Retrieved 12 November 2005.
 Sydney Organising Committee for the Olympic Games (2001). Official Report of the XXVII Olympiad Volume 1: Preparing for the Games. Retrieved 20 November 2005.
 Sydney Organising Committee for the Olympic Games (2001). Official Report of the XXVII Olympiad Volume 2: Celebrating the Games. Retrieved 20 November 2005.
 Sydney Organising Committee for the Olympic Games (2001). The Results. Retrieved 20 November 2005.
 International Olympic Committee Web Site

Nations at the 2000 Summer Olympics
2000
Summer Olympics